William Crow may refer to:

William Crow (MP) (fl. 1698–1699), Irish politician
William E. Crow (1870–1922), American lawyer and Republican party politician
William J. Crow (1902–1974), U.S. Representative from Pennsylvania
Bill Crow (born 1927), jazz guitarist

See also
William Crowe (disambiguation)